Rainer Fischer (born September 14, 1949) is a Canadian retired judoka, who represented Canada at the 1976 Summer Olympics in Montreal, Quebec, Canada. He won the gold medal at the 1975 Pan American Games in the men's middleweight division (– 80 kg) and a bronze medal at the 1974 Pan American judo championships in Panama. He won six national titles between 1972 and 1976 including three Middleweight (-80 kg) and three Open Weight titles as a middleweight.

Fischer was born in Hamburg, Germany.

See also
 Judo in Ontario
Judo in Canada
 List of Canadian judoka

References

1949 births
Living people
Canadian male judoka
Judoka at the 1976 Summer Olympics
Olympic judoka of Canada
German emigrants to Canada
Sportspeople from Hamburg
Pan American Games gold medalists for Canada
Pan American Games medalists in judo
Judoka at the 1975 Pan American Games
Medalists at the 1975 Pan American Games
20th-century Canadian people
21st-century Canadian people